Phthiotis (Fthiótida, ; ancient Greek and Katharevousa: Φθιῶτις) is one of the regional units of Greece. It is part of the administrative region of Central Greece. The capital is the city of Lamia.  It is bordered by the Malian Gulf to the east, Boeotia in the south, Phocis in the south, Aetolia-Acarnania in the southwest, Evrytania in the west, Karditsa regional unit in the north, Larissa regional unit in the north, and Magnesia in the northeast.  The name dates back to ancient times. It is best known as the home of Achilles.

Geography

Phthiotis covers the northern and southern shorelines of the Malian Gulf, an inlet of the Aegean Sea. It stretches inland towards the west along the valley of the river Spercheios. In the south it covers the upper part of the Cephissus valley. There are several mountain ranges in Phthiotis, including the Othrys in the northeast, the Tymfristos in the west, the Vardousia in the southwest, Oeta in the south and the Kallidromo in the southeast.

History
"Phthiotis" means "the region of Phthia", the southernmost region of ancient Thessaly around Pharsalus and home of Achilles. In Classical times, it also referred to the region of Achaea Phthiotis, which bordered on Thessalian Phthiotis to the south and east. Achaea Phthiotis covered the northern part of the present regional unit Phthiotis and the southern part of present Magnesia. The southeastern part of present Phthiotis was covered by the ancient region Locris, and the southwestern part was ancient Malis and Ainis.

Transport
 E65, S, Cen., NE
 Greek National Road 1/E75, SE, E, Cen., NE
 Greek National Road 3, SE, S, Cen., N
 Greek National Road 27, S, Cen.
 Greek National Road 38, W, Cen.

Administration

The regional unit Phthiotis is subdivided into 7 municipalities. These are (number as in the map in the infobox):
 Amfikleia-Elateia (2)
 Domokos (3)
 Kamena Vourla (6)
 Lamia (1)
 Lokroi (4)
 Makrakomi (5)
 Stylida (7)

Prefecture

The prefecture Phthiotis and Phocis was created in 1845. In 1947 this prefecture was split into the southern part Phocis and the northern part Phthiotis. As a part of the 2011 Kallikratis government reform, the regional unit Phthiotis was created out of the former prefecture Phthiotis. The prefecture had the same territory as the present regional unit. At the same time, the municipalities were reorganised, according to the table below.

Provinces
 Province of Domokos - Domokos
 Province of Phthiotis - Lamia
 Province of Locris - Atalanti
Note: Provinces no longer hold any legal status in Greece.

Persons
 Thanos Livaditis (1934–2005)
 Dimitrios Holevas

Sporting teams
 Lamia F.C.
 Ionikos Lamias BC

See also
 List of traditional Greek place names
 List of settlements in Phthiotis

References

External links
 

 
Prefectures of Greece
Regional units of Central Greece